"Heroine" is a song by British pop act Shakespears Sister, released in 1988 as a single from their debut album Sacred Heart. "Heroine" was released in most territories as a Double A-side with "Break My Heart (You Really)", which according to Siobhan Fahey was to "give a more rounded picture of what I'm about". In North American territories however, both songs were released as separate A-side singles.

Track listing 
Canadian 12" single
"Heroine" (Extended Version) — 5:29
"Dirty Mind" — 4:06
"Heroine" (Live in Leningrad) — 4:45
"Dirty Mind" (Live in Leningrad) — 4:42

Double A-side CD single
"Break My Heart (You Really)" (Shep Pettibone House Mix) — 7:25
"Break My Heart (You Really)" (7" Version) — 3:32
"Heroine" (Extended Version) — 5:33

Double A-side 7" single
"Break My Heart (You Really)" — 3:29
"Heroine" — 3:45

US 12" single
"Heroine" — 5:33
"Heroine" (LP Version) — 3:45
"Dirty Mind" — 4:06
"Heroine" (Live) — 4:52
"Dirty Mind" (Live) — 4:44

References 

Shakespears Sister songs
1988 debut singles
Songs written by Siobhan Fahey
Songs written by Richard Feldman (songwriter)
1988 songs